Standard Motor Construction Company (1904-1905) was the successor to the U. S. Long Distance Automobile Company (1900-1903) of Jersey City, New Jersey.  The American Veteran Era Long Distance automobile was developed into the Standard automobile in 1904.

U. S. Long Distance Automobile Company 

Lt. John C. Fremont, D. J. Newland and Lewis Nixon founded the U. S. Long Distance Automobile Company in 1900 to manufacture gasoline marine engines and automobiles. A plant in Jersey City, New Jersey first produced gasoline marine engines followed by gasoline automobiles in 1901.  C. C. Riotte who had previously designed marine engines, designed the Long Distance and superintended manufacturing.

From 1901 to 1903, five models were offered. All engines were water-cooled, with a planetary transmission with two or three gears and chain drive. Steering wheels replaced tiller steering in late 1902.

 The Type A had a single-cylinder engine with 7-hp . The chassis had a wheelbase of 74-inches with a runabout body priced at $1,000, .
 The Type B had a two-cylinder engine with 10-hp. The wheelbase was 80-inches with a tonneau body priced at $1,500.
 The Type C had a slightly more powerful two-cylinder engine with 12-hp, the same wheelbase and a tonneau body priced at $2,500, .
 The Type D was the top model with a three-cylinder engine produced 20-hp.  Wheelbase and body were the same as Type B and was priced at $4,000.
 The Type E was a Type B as a delivery van priced at $2,000.
Production plans were for ten to twelve vehicles a week. The company acquired a Selden patent license.  In January 1904, U. S. Long Distance was reorganized as the Standard Motor Construction Company, with the factory at the same 307 Whiton Street address in Jersey City.

Standard Motor Construction Company 

Standard Motor Construction Company was founded in January 1904 in Jersey City , New Jersey to succeed the U. S. Long Distance Automobile Company.  C. C.  Riotte designed larger luxury cars to succeed the Long Distance.  The brand name was Standard but for the first year it was advertised as the Standard Tourist U S Long Distance.

Standard vehicles had four-cylinder 25-hp engines, with a three-speed gearbox and a chain-drive. In 1904 the Tourist model was on a 95-inch wheelbase with a side-entrance touring body, luxury priced at $3,000, .  For 1905, the wheelbase was extended to 109-inches with the touring car now priced at $3,500.  A landaulet was offered for $3,900, .

The company elected to close down and automobile production ended in the summer of 1905.  Edward Ringwood Hewitt acquired the company's Selden license for his Hewitt Motor Company which was formed in 1906.

References

External links 

Defunct motor vehicle manufacturers of the United States
Motor vehicle manufacturers based in New Jersey
Cars introduced in 1901
Cars introduced in 1904
Vehicle manufacturing companies established in 1900
Vehicle manufacturing companies disestablished in 1903
Vehicle manufacturing companies established in 1904
Vehicle manufacturing companies disestablished in 1905
Veteran vehicles
Brass Era vehicles
1900s cars
Luxury motor vehicle manufacturers
Luxury vehicles